Coyle Creek is a small creek in the municipalities of Welland, Pelham, and West Lincoln in Ontario, Canada, that forms an important component of the Welland River watershed. The last section of the creek constitutes an oasis of wild habitat in an otherwise increasingly developed area; the upper section of the creek runs through a golf course.

The creek contains numerous fish species, including largemouth bass, northern pike, crappie, channel catfish, sunfish, and various species of minnow. As well, mud puppies are present in the creek. The surrounding woods are home to a wide variety of wildlife, including beavers, which are comparatively rare in Southern Ontario due to habitat loss.

See also  
List of rivers of Ontario

References

 (Map)

External links
Friends of Coyle Creek

Rivers of the Regional Municipality of Niagara